The Packard Super Eight was the larger of the two eight-cylinder luxury automobiles produced by the Packard Motor Car Company of Detroit, Michigan. It shared frames and some body types with the top model Packard Twelve. The 1933-1936 Packard Super Eight was a big classic. In 1937, it was reduced to a smaller and lighter design. Following the discontinuation of the Sixteenth Series Twelve after the 1939 model year, a new Custom Super Eight One-Eighty was derived from the Super Eight as the new top car range. The Super Eight was renamed the Super Eight One-Sixty starting a naming convention change in 1940. These two models shared most mechanical components including the 160 HP straight Eight engine and continued to be regarded as the Senior Packard.

After 1942, Packard concentrated on the new Clipper styling that was developed for an upper-class sedan the previous year. There were Super Clippers and Custom Super Clipper in the One-Sixty and One-Eighty tradition until 1947. After a heavy facelift, the name Clipper was dropped. 

For 1948 the most senior Super Eight One-Eighty became the Custom Eight, while its slightly lower-priced sibling, the Super Eight One-Sixty, once again became simply the Super Eight with the more modestly prices Eight with five body styles including the Packard Station Sedan. Clipper Custom Super Eights and Custom Eights were very close relatives to their respective Super models, distinguished outside by the lack of an eggcrate grille and small rear chrome trim moulding under the trunk lid on Supers. In 1949, a new Super Eight Deluxe was added to the line. This car had also the Custom Eight's eggcrate grille, but not the rear trim.

The entire range of Packard's motorcars was renamed for the 1951 model year (twenty-fourth series), when the Super Eight was renamed 400.

Gallery

References 

Super Eight
Rear-wheel-drive vehicles
1940s cars